Orton railway station served the estate of Orton, Moray, Scotland from 1858 to 1964 on the Inverness and Aberdeen Junction Railway.

History 
The station opened on 18 August 1858 by the Inverness and Aberdeen Junction Railway. It closed to both passengers and goods traffic on 7 December 1964.

References

External links 

Disused railway stations in Moray
Former Highland Railway stations
Railway stations in Great Britain opened in 1858
Railway stations in Great Britain closed in 1964
Beeching closures in Scotland
1858 establishments in Scotland
1964 disestablishments in Scotland